Donald Howard Wollett (July 5, 1919 – September 23, 2014) was an American college professor, baseball salary arbitrator, and author.

Personal life
He was born in Muscatine, Iowa and died in Freeland, Washington. He attended Bradley University, the University of Chicago and Indiana University. He served in the United States Navy during World War II.

Professional life
Starting in the 1940s, he worked for the University of Washington. In 1959, he took a position to work at the New York School of Law. From 1978 to 1990, he taught at the McGeorge School of Law. He also worked at Louisiana State University, University of California and Harvard Law School.

Wollett wrote and contributed to many books. With co-author Benjamin Aaron in 1960, he published Labor Relations and the Law. Wollett wrote the 2008 book Getting on Base: Unionism in Baseball and the 2013 book Dog Law (with Susan Crowell). In 2014, he published The Peculiar Business of Labor Law and Thoughts, also with Crowell.

He was considered "he only person left who’s pushing for a minor-league union" in 2012. He made the headlines later in life after publicly criticizing the Department of Veterans Affairs for rejecting him a pension for his service during World War II.

References

1919 births
2014 deaths
Louisiana State University faculty
University of Washington faculty
United States Navy personnel of World War II
Bradley University alumni
University of Chicago alumni
Indiana University alumni
University of California faculty
Harvard Law School faculty